Nanhe District is a district in the south of Hebei province, China. It is under the administration of Xingtai City.

Administrative divisions

Towns:
Heyang, Jiasong, Haoqiao

Townships:
Dongsanzhao Township, Yanli Township, Heguo Township, Shizhao Township, Sansi Township

Climate

References

External links

County-level divisions of Hebei
Xingtai